County routes in Lewis County, New York, are signed with the Manual on Uniform Traffic Control Devices-standard yellow-on-blue pentagon route marker.

Routes 1–40

Routes 41 and up

See also

County routes in New York

References